, sometimes referred to as Mushanokōjisenke, is one of the schools of Japanese tea ceremony. Along with Urasenke and Omotesenke, the Mushakōjisenke is one of the three lines of the Sen family descending from Sen no Rikyū, which together are known as the san-Senke or "three Sen houses/families" (三千家). The head or iemoto of this line carries the hereditary name Sōshu (宗守).

History 
Mushakōjisenke is associated with Sen no Rikyū's great-grandson , who was the second to the oldest of Sen no Sōtan's four sons. Like his older brother, he was Sōtan's son by Sōtan's first wife, and through much of his life he lived apart from the Sen house. During this time, he became a lacquer artisan. At the behest of his younger brothers, however, he set up his own tea house, called the Kankyū-an, on Mushakōji street, and became devoted to practicing and teaching the Way of Tea.  

Ichiō Sōshu was appointed tea teacher to the Matsudaira clan in Takamatsu, Sanuki Province. Until the Meiji Restoration, the family heir through the generations was in service to the Matsudaira of Takamatsu.

Generations

References

External links

 Mushakōjisenke website

Chadō